A chimere (or  ) is a garment worn by Anglican bishops in choir dress, and, formally as part of academic dress.

A descendant of a riding cloak, the chimere resembles an academic gown but without sleeves, and is usually made of scarlet or black cloth. In modern English use the garment is worn as part of the ceremonial dress of Anglican bishops. It is a long sleeveless gown of silk or satin, open down the front, gathered in at the back between the shoulders, and with slits for the arms. It is worn over the rochet, colored either black or scarlet (a combination referred to as "convocation robes").

Ecclesiastical use

The chimere is worn by the bishops of the Anglican Communion as a component of their choir habit. It is traditionally coloured either scarlet or black, although some bishops have innovated a purple chimere. The wrist-bands of the bishop's rochet typically match the colour of the chimere.

For Anglican bishops, the chimere is part of their formal vesture in choir dress — typically the chimere would be worn over a purple cassock and the rochet and would be accompanied by a black scarf known as a tippet, with an optional academic hood. The chimere may be worn when vested in the cope, but not necessarily. Because of liturgical changes in the later nineteenth and twentieth centuries, it is no longer common for the chimere to be worn when celebrating the Eucharist, though the practice is still kept up by some low-church bishops.

Traditionally, the red chimere was worn only by bishops holding the degree of Doctor of Divinity and the black chimere by the others. This did not matter for many years, as formerly all bishops were formerly granted the degree of Doctor of Divinity on being consecrated. When this practice ceased, the distinction was largely ignored, as in recent times many bishops regularly wear the red chimere, regardless of their academic status.

On the analogy of the Catholic mantelletta certain Anglican prelates have from time to time appeared in purple chimeres. An influential article on chimeres and their colours was penned by the Rev. N. F. Robinson at the end of the 19th century. It urged the retention of the garment, and especially the black chimere.

In some churches the lead singer in the choir is permitted to wear a chimere.  It is a traditional part of the vestment of a verger.

History
The word, from the Latin chimera, chimaera (Old French chamarre, Modern Fr. simarre; Italian zimarra; cf.

Its secular precursor was worn also by the Roman Senators, and is still worn by some university professors.

The origin of the chimere has been the subject of much debate; but the view that it is a modification of the cope is now discarded, and it is practically proved to be derived from the medieval tabard (tabardum, taberda or collobium), an upper garment worn in civil life by all classes of people both in England and abroad. It has therefore a common origin with certain items of academic dress.

The word chimere, which first appears in England in the 14th century, was sometimes applied not only to the tabard worn over the rochet, but to the sleeved cassock worn under it. Thus Richard le Scrope (Archbishop of York, died 1405) is described as wearing on his way to his execution a blue chimere with sleeves. But the word properly applies to the sleeveless tabard which tended to supersede, from the 15th century onwards, the inconvenient cappa clausa (a long closed cloak with a slit in front for the arms) as the out-of-doors upper garment of bishops. These chimeres, the colors of which (murrey, scarlet, green, etc.) may possibly have denoted academical rank, were part of the civil costume of prelates. Thus in the inventory of Walter Skirlawe, bishop of Durham (1405–1406), eight chimeres of various colors are mentioned, including two for riding (pro equitatura). The chimere was, moreover, a cold weather garment. In summer its place was taken by the tippet.

By a late abuse the sleeves of the rochet were, from motives of convenience, sometimes attached to the chimere.

In the Anglican form for the consecration of bishops the newly consecrated prelate, hitherto vested in rochet, is directed to put on the rest of the episcopal habit, i.e. the chimere. The robe has thus become in the Church of England symbolic of the episcopal office, and is in effect a liturgical vestment. The rubric containing this direction was added to the Book of Common Prayer in 1662; and there is proof that the development of the chimere into at least a choir vestment was subsequent to the Reformation. Foxe, indeed, mentions that Hooper at his consecration wore a long scarlet "chymere" down to the foot (Acts and Mon., ed. 1563, p. 1051), a source of trouble to himself and of scandal to other extreme reformers; but that this was no more than the full civil dress of a bishop is proved by the fact that Archbishop Parker at his consecration wore surplice and tippet, and only put on the chimere, when the service was over, to go away in. This civil quality of the garment still survives alongside the other; the full dress of an Anglican prelate at civil functions of importance (e.g. in parliament, or at court) is still rochet and chimere.

Catholic counterparts
The Encyclopædia Britannica Eleventh Edition spoke of the zimarra or simarre as the equivalent on the European continent of the chimere and indicated that the English word was derived, through Old French, from the Italian term . It cited ecclesiologists as defining the zimarra as a kind of soutane (cassock), from which it was distinguished by having a small cape and short, open arms (manches-fausses) reaching to the middle of the upper arm and decorated with buttons. The same ecclesiologists identified the zimarra with the epitogium, which was described as "the uppermost garment of the clergy, worn over the soutane, instead of the mantellum". In France and Germany it was fitted more or less to the figure; in Italy it was wider and fell down straight in front. Unlike the chimere, it was not associated with any particular rank of clergy and was not universally used by them. As late as the middle of the 18th century, the zimarra was still in common use as an out-of-doors overcoat, but after that it was in Italy associated with certain members of the clergy, senators of the city of Rome (before the unification of Italy) and university professors. At the time of composition of the Encyclopædia Britannica article, the Pope wore a black zimarra lined with white, and sometimes ornamented with a white binding and gold tassels.

In the Catholic Church, the zimarra was never a liturgical vestment nor part of choir dress. It was merely a more or less loose cloak that the clergy sometimes used as part of their everyday civilian dress. In Italian, the term zimarra is generally used not of a close-fitting garment, such as the cassock, but of a loose over-garment, similar to the fur-lined Schaube used in northern Europe. Images of the zimarra as worn by women can be seen at Dressing the Italian Way and The Italian Showcase.

While the word "chimere" is derived from the Italian word "zimarra", the Roman Catholic ecclesiastical garment that is most like the loose-fitting chimere itself is the mantelletta, whose use by cardinals and bishops was abolished by the 1969 Instruction on the Dress, Titles and Coats-of-Arms of Cardinals, Bishops and Lesser Prelates. The same document abolished the mantelletta also for lesser prelates in general, maintaining it only for a limited number of officials of the Roman Curia.

Academic Use
As an item of academic dress, a slightly modified version of the chimere is, for instance, prescribed at the University of Oxford for doctors in Convocation Dress — and as such it is referred to as the Convocation Habit. The differences are that the chimere is worn open and the Convocation Habit is worn closed with two large buttons.

If an Anglican bishop is part of the "platform party" at a commencement (that is, the speaker, or is giving the invocation or benediction) he may wear the rochet and chimere with the appropriate hood and academic cap.

References

Sources
(incomplete)
 
 the Report of the British parliamentary sub-committee of Convocation on the ornaments of the church and its ministers, p. 31 (London, 1908);
 Herbert Druitt, Costume on Brasses (London, 1906)
 G. Moroni, Dizionario dell erudizione storico-ecclesiastica (Venice, 1861), vol. 103, s.v. Zimarra
 X. Barbier de Montault, Traité pratique de la construction, etc., des églises, ii. 538 (Paris, 1878).

Academic dress
Anglican vestments
Robes and cloaks